Steve Doran is an English community organiser, activist and former radio DJ from the University of Nottingham. She is currently fronting a campaign against payday lenders in the UK in conjunction with Movement For Change. She has discussed the issues surrounding payday lending on BBC news, ITV news, Channel 5 News and on Sky News. She recently met with Ed Miliband to discuss proposed policy on payday lending.

At the 2006 Student Radio Awards held on 9 November, Steve was announced as the Gold Award winner for Best Female Presenter. On Friday 13 April 2007, Doran presented the Early Breakfast Show on BBC Radio 1, in a slot designed to showcase new talent, and as direct result of her win the previous year of the Student Radio Award. Steve became well-known on her university campus after doing 40 hours solidly on URN to raise money for Children in Need 2005. She presented the Evening Show on Tuesdays as well as The Graveyard Shift on Sundays for URN, the university student radio station.

Steve has also served as Mayoress of Dartford 2006-7, acting as consort to the Mayor, her uncle Councillor David Hammock at the age of 19. Doran was also President of the Nottingham University Debating Union (2006-2007). For her contribution to student life at Nottingham she was made an Honorary Life Member of the Students' Union in 2007.

References

People associated with the University of Nottingham
English radio personalities
Living people
Year of birth missing (living people)